Sergeant Thomas Frank Durrant VC (17 October 1918 – 28 March 1942) was a soldier in the British Army during the Second World War and a posthumous English recipient of the Victoria Cross, the highest award for gallantry in the face of the enemy that can be awarded to British and Commonwealth forces. His award of the Victoria Cross was unique in that it is the only award given to a soldier in a naval action. It was also unusual, though not unique, in having been suggested by a German officer. (For similar cases see Lt Cdr Gerard Roope VC RN, recommended by letter from Kapitan zur See Hellmuth Heye, commanding the German cruiser Admiral Hipper, and Flying Officer Lloyd Trigg VC RNZAF, recommended by Oberleutnant Klemens Schamong, captain U-468.)

Early life
Thomas Frank Durrant was born on 17 October 1918 and lived in Green Street Green, Farnborough, Kent. He attended Green Street Green Primary School, formally known as Vine Road Primary School.  After leaving school, he worked as a butcher's boy, then as a builder's labourer.

Military service
Durrant enlisted in the Corps of Royal Engineers prior to the Second World War on 1 February 1937. His service number was 1874047. In 1940 the British Prime Minister Winston Churchill ordered the formation of units of specially trained troops that would, "develop a reign of terror down the enemy coast." Durrant volunteered for service with the Special Service Independent Companies and was posted to No. 2 Special Independent Company. It was when serving with No. 2 Independent Company in the Norwegian campaign that he was promoted in the field to Sergeant. When his company returned from Norway all the independent companies were formed into battalion sized units known as Commandos. Durrant then became a member of No. 1 Commando.

St Nazaire
The St Nazaire Raid (Operation Chariot) was a seaborne attack on the heavily defended docks of Saint-Nazaire in occupied France on the night of 28 March 1942. This was a combined operation undertaken by Royal Navy and Commando units. The main commando force was provided by No. 2 Commando with supporting demolition parties from other commando units, including Durrant's No. 1 Commando. The intention of the raid was to destroy the dry dock which would force any large German warship in need of repairs, such as the Tirpitz, to return to home waters rather than seek safe haven in the Atlantic coast. Of the 600 men who left the port of Falmouth, Cornwall, England on the raid only 225 would return.

During the raid Sergeant Durrant was in charge of a twin Lewis gun on board H.M. Motor Launch 306. As it came up the river Loire to the port of St Nazaire ML306 came under heavy fire from the shore and was unable to land its troops at the Old Mole and it is during its withdrawal that it came head-to-head with a pursuing German destroyer of the Mowe class, the Jaguar. In the battle with the German destroyer Durrant was wounded numerous times, in the head, both arms, legs, chest and stomach. After the battle Durrant died of his wounds in a German military hospital in St Nazaire. Following his death he was buried in La Baule-Escoublac War Cemetery,  from Saint-Nazaire, in Plot I, Row D, Grave 11. A week later the commander of the German destroyer, Kapitänleutnant F. K. Paul, met the Commando commander, Lieutenant-Colonel Augustus Charles Newman, in a prisoner of war camp in Rennes. Bringing the action to Newman's attention, Paul suggested that the colonel might wish to recommend Durrant for a high award.

His Victoria Cross citation reads:

Aftermath
Durrant is buried in La Baule-Escoublac War Cemetery, France in Plot I, Row D, Grave 11.

The award of the Victoria Cross to Durrant was announced in the London Gazette on 15 June 1945, at the same time it was announced the Commando commander during the raid Lieutenant Colonel Augustus Charles Newman had also been awarded the Victoria Cross. On 29 October 1946 Durrant's Victoria Cross was presented to his mother at an investiture at Buckingham Palace by King George VI. Durrant's Victoria Cross is now on display at the Royal Engineers Museum Prince Arthur Road, Gillingham, Kent, England.

References

Bibliography

External links
 (detailed description of the action)
Location of grave and VC medal (France)

1918 births
1942 deaths
Burials in France
People from Farnborough, London
British World War II recipients of the Victoria Cross
Royal Engineers soldiers
British Army personnel killed in World War II
British Army Commandos soldiers
British Army recipients of the Victoria Cross
Military personnel from Kent